Melanoplus rotundipennis, known generally as round-winged grasshopper, is a species of spur-throated grasshopper in the family Acrididae. Other common names include the round-winged spur-throat grasshopper and round-winged locust. It is found in North America.

References

Melanoplinae
Articles created by Qbugbot
Insects described in 1877